The following list is a discography of production by Dot da Genius, an American hip hop record producer from Brooklyn, New York. It includes a list of songs produced, co-produced and remixed by year, artist, album and title.

Singles produced

2008

Kid Cudi - A Kid Named Cudi
07. "Day 'n' Nite"
16. "Cleveland is the Reason"
Leftover
00. "Dat New New"

2009

Mickey Factz
00. "Who's Hotter"

Kid Cudi - Man on the Moon: The End of Day
07. "Day 'n' Nite (Nightmare)"
Leftover
00. "Highs 'n' Lows"
 Sample Credit: Bob Dylan - "Lay Lady Lay"
00. "Know Why"
00. "Dose of Dopeness"

2010

Fabri Fibra - Controcultura
10. "Insensibile" (featuring Dargen D'Amico)
17. "In Alto" (featuring Simona Barbieri)

Kid Cudi - Man on the Moon II: The Legend of Mr. Rager
05. "Marijuana" (co-produced with Kid Cudi & Mike Dean)
17. "Trapped in My Mind" (co-produced with Kid Cudi)
18. "Maybe" (iTunes Bonus Track)

2011

Various artists - Music from and Inspired by the Motion Picture Fright Night
01. "No One Believes Me" (performed by Kid Cudi) (co-produced with Kid Cudi)

2012

Chip tha Ripper - Tell Ya Friends
20. "Ride 4 U" (featuring Kid Cudi & Far East Movement)

Rilgood - JFK
13. "Banga" (Bonus Track)

Micahfonecheck - August Rush
04. "Broke Broke"

D-WHY - Don't Flatter Yourself
15. "So Committed"

Mr. MFN eXquire - Power & Passion
01. "Cari Zalioni"

2013

Fabri Fibra - Guerra e Pace
09. "La Solitudine Dei Numeri Uno" (produced with Woodro Skillson)
13. "Nemico Pubblico" (produced with Woodro Skillson)
16. "Alta Vendita" (produced with Woodro Skillson)

Kid Cudi - Indicud
06. "Immortal" (provided drums & strings)
08. "Girls" (featuring Too Short) (provided drums & synths)

Rockie Fresh - The Birthday Tape
05. "Rollin'" (featuring Gunplay)

King Chip - 44108
10. "Police in the Trunk" (produced with Rami)

Mr. MFN eXquire - Kismet: Blue Edition
25. "Untitled" (featuring Chance the Rapper)

Rilgood - Kingdom
03. "Young Kings" (produced with Woodro Skillson)

Various artists - Saint Heron
11. "Drinking and Driving" (performed by Jhené Aiko)

2014

Kid Cudi - Satellite Flight: The Journey to Mother Moon
06. "Too Bad I Have to Destroy You Now" (co-produced with Kid Cudi)

Jhené Aiko - Souled Out
01. "Limbo Limbo Limbo" (additional production from Woodro Skillson)
07. "Wading"

Various artists - LA Leakers & LRG Presents: Leaks of the Industry '14
02. "Everything I Am" (Logic featuring Hit-Boy and Audio Push)

2015

Fabri Fibra -  Squallor
08. "Cosa Avevi Capito?"

Audio Push - Good Vibe Tribe
06. "Normally" (co-produced with Hit-Boy)

2016

Jesse Boykins III - Bartholomew
11. "Vegetables"

6LACK - Free 6LACK
11. "Alone / EA6"

Kid Cudi - Passion, Pain & Demon Slayin'
15. "Kitchen" 
16. "Cosmic Warrior"
17. "The Guide"

2017

Talib Kweli and Styles P - The Seven 
05. "Teleprompters"

Jhené Aiko - Trip 
01. "LSD"
08. "New Balance" 
12. "Nobody" 
14. "Bad Trip (Interlude)"
21. "Ascension" 
23. "Hello Ego" 
24. "Clear My Mind"

2018

Andrew Lockington - Rampage – Original Motion Picture Soundtrack 
24. "The Rage"

Kids See Ghosts - Kids See Ghosts
05. "Reborn" 
07. "Cudi Montage"

Nas - Nasir 
01. "Not for Radio" 
04. "Bonjour"

Various artists - Rampage – Original Motion Picture Soundtrack
24. "The Rage"

Various artists - The Sound of Electronica, Vol. 13
12. "Shirak"

2019

Elley Duhé 
00. "Good Die Young"

Lil Nas X - 7 
02. "Panini"

2020

Kid Cudi - Man on the Moon III: The Chosen
01. "Beautiful Trip" 
02. "Tequila Shots" 
03. "Another Day" 
04. "She Knows This" 
05. "Dive" 
06. "Damaged" 
07. "Heaven on Earth" 
08. "Show Out" 
09. "Mr. Solo Dolo III" 
10. "Sad People" 
11. "Elsie's Baby Boy (Flashback)" 
12. "Sept. 16" 
13. "The Void" 
14. "Lovin' Me" 
15. "The Pale Moonlight" 
16. "Rockstar Knights" 
17. "4 Da Kidz" 
18. "Lord I Know"

2022

Denzel Curry - Melt My Eyez See Your Future
03. "Worst Comes to Worst" 
14. "The Ills"

See also
WZRD production discography

Notes

References

External links
 
 
 
 

Production discographies
 
Hip hop discographies
Discographies of American artists